The Asian Rugby League Federation (ARLF) is a rugby league organisation founded in 2011. It comprises Japan, China, Indonesia, Philippines, Singapore, Malaysia, India and Thailand. Its purpose is to provide international competition between its members by staging a biannual tournament.

Competitions

The Asian Rugby League Cup (ARLC) was established in 2012. The Inaugural cup was won by the Philippines, who defeated Thailand in Bangkok.

See also

Asia-Pacific Rugby League Confederation
Rugby League Asian Cup

References

External links

Rugby league governing bodies
Sports organizations established in 2011
Sports organisations of Singapore
Rugby league in Asia